Sarah O'Connor (born 20 November 1984) is an Australian field hockey player.

References

1984 births
Living people
Australian female field hockey players
Place of birth missing (living people)
21st-century Australian women